The Kók Tóbe Park is a recreational area in Almaty, Kazakhstan that has a amusement park attractions and restaurants. It is  located on top of Kok Tobe and connected to downtown Almaty by a cable car line. The City Terminal is located near Hotel Kazakhstan. Also, there is a 372 meters tall TV Tower at the foot of the mountain. The tower can be seen from most parts of the city.

History
The park was opened in 2006 and a Beatles monument was constructed in 2007. In September 2014, the mountain was closed for the construction of a new cable car, as well as the reconstruction of the northern side of the mountain and the park. In March 2016, the park completed its construction of the cable car and the park. Transport in the area currently comprises 17 cable cars. A new Ferris wheel was also built in the park

Attractions

Almaty Tower

Almaty Tower (aka Kok Tobe Tower), the city's television tower, is located on the south-eastern slope of the hill. It was built during 1975 and 1983, and if measured from sea level, this tower is one of the highest in the world – 372 meters tall. It has a couple observation platforms, but they are not open to the public. It is unique, because unlike other TV towers, it was built entirely of steel, and has a tubular structure. Locals considered constructing the TV tower somewhere else, but it ended up being built in Kok Tobe area.

Beatles monument

A bronze statue of The Beatles by sculptor Eduard Kazaryan was placed on Kok Tobe mountain on 15 May 2007. The monument was inaugurated as part of the launch of the National Award "Music feature – 2007". This is the first monument to depict the band members in full. John Lennon is seen sitting on a bench with his guitar, while behind him stand Paul McCartney, George Harrison and Ringo Starr.

Entertainment

Kok Tobe park has various entertainments such as a fountain of "desire" in the shape of an apple, a children's playground, a climbing wall, the Fast Coaster ride, an art gallery, and tea house. The park also includes restaurant "Yurt", which was modeled after traditional nomadic houses called Yurta. The restaurant is embellished with traditional Kazakh carpentry and tapestry. In addition to these attractions, on the Kok Tobe there are viewing platforms, a petting zoo, a concert hall, a lovers alley, ponds, and shops selling national souvenirs.

Fast Coaster
Fast Coaster is a roller coaster located on the hillside. It is the only roller coaster in Kazakhstan that is located on a side of a mountain. Going down with a speed of 45 km/h, users have views over the city.

Alley of Lovers 

Alley lovers on the park is a place for romantic walks and dates.

Fountain of Desires 
The Fountain of Desires in the form of granite apple, the symbol of Almaty, welcomes guests at Kok Tobe Peak. Some people throw coins into the depths of its waters, while others take photos near it.

Ferris Wheel 
Located in the park Ferris wheel's height is 30 meters. It is 1,136 meters above sea level. There are 20 closed highly comfortable and safe cabins, 6 passengers for each cabin. There is great view on Almaty from cabins.

Gallery

References

Almaty
Parks in Almaty